Maria Anna Fesemayr (sometimes spelled Fesemayer) (1743–1782) was a Salzburg court singer, who sang in Mozart's Die Schuldigkeit des ersten Gebots and created the role of Ninetta in La finta semplice and the role of Elisa in Il re pastore. She was the third wife of the composer and organist Anton Cajetan Adlgasser. Leopold was the witnesses at their wedding.

References 
 Halliwell, Ruth, The Mozart family: four lives in a social context, Oxford University Press, 1998. 

1743 births
1782 deaths
Austrian operatic sopranos
18th-century Austrian women opera singers
Musicians from Salzburg